Princeton Junction may refer to: 

Princeton Junction, New Jersey, a census-designated place and unincorporated community in Mercer County
Princeton Junction station, a rail station in the above community